Borno is an Italian comune    in Val Camonica, province of Brescia, in Lombardy.

It is located on the so-called plateau of the Sun.

Main sights

 Parish Church of San Martin and John the Baptist (18th century).
 Oratory of San Antonio,  right of the parish. It houses a fresco by Callisto Piazza.
 Oratory of the Disciplini
 Church of Our Lady of Sorrows (17th century)
 Church of Our Lady of Lourdes, previously dedicated to Saints Vitus and Modestus (16th  century)
 Church of San Fiorino (or Floriano) from the 9th  century, with the nave from the 16th century.
 Church of San Fermo, remodeled in the 16th and 17th century.

Culture

The scütüm are, in Camunian dialect, nicknames, sometimes personal, elsewhere showing the characteristic features of a community.  The one which characterize the people of Borno are Burnàs, Bigi, Làder, maia patate.

People 
  Giovanni Battista Re, Roman Catholic cardinal

References

Sources

External links

 Historical photos - Intercam
 Historical photos - Lombardia Beni Culturali

Cities and towns in Lombardy